Stig-Tore Moen Nilsen (born 9 August 1994) is a Norwegian handball player for GOG Håndbold and the Norwegian national team.

References

Norwegian male handball players
Expatriate handball players
Norwegian expatriate sportspeople in Sweden
1994 births
Living people
IFK Kristianstad players